Sayyid Yahya Murtuza mosque or Hazrat Ali mosque is a historical mosque of the 17th century. It is a part of Old City and located on Asaf Zeynalli street, in the city of Baku, in Azerbaijan. The building was also registered as a national architectural monument by the decision of the Cabinet of Ministers of the Republic of Azerbaijan dated August 2, 2001, No. 132.

About
Located on the medieval caravan trade route, this mosque was built in the early 17th century. It was built on own expenses of Sayyid Yahya Murtuza, who was one of the most influential personalities of his era. He acted as a religious clergyman figure in the mosque. He was buried in the courtyard of the mosque after his death. At present, his grave is located next to the entrance door of the mosque.

The mosque operated as a carpenter workshop during Azerbaijan SSR period.

After the 1990s, the mosque became a part of Icheri Sheher Juma Mosque. Currently, Hazrat Mohammed mosque religious community operates in the mosque.

The mosque is  square shaped in the plan and has a central dome and no minaret. On the south wall there is a  stalactic tiered mihrab.

Gallery

See also
Juma Mosque (Baku)
Chin Mosque
Haji Heybat Mosque
Khidir Mosque

References

Monuments and memorials in Azerbaijan
Mosques in Baku
Museums in Azerbaijan
Icherisheher